The athletics competition at the 2015 African Games was held from 13–17 September 2015 at the New Kintele Stadium in Brazzaville, in the Republic of Congo.

The original winners of the long jump competitions, Chinaza Amadi and Samson Idiata of Nigeria, failed drugs tests at the competition and were disqualified.

Medal summary

Men

Women

Para-sport

Men

Women

Medal tables

Elite competition

Para-sport competition

Participating nations
According to an unofficial count, there were 564 athletes from 48 nations participating in the elite competition.

References

Reports
Mulkeen, Jon (2015-09-15). Ivorian sprint double for Meite and Ta Lou at All-African Games. IAAF. Retrieved on 2017-03-22.
Minshull, Phil (2015-09-17). Kenya's 4x400m men finish off the All-Africa Games in style. IAAF. Retrieved on 2017-03-22.

External links
 Results
 Results for Athletics 
 Para-sport Detailed Results
 Para-sport Medal Table

 
2015
African Games
Athletics
2015 African Games